Helle-Moonika Helme (born Helle-Moonika Rauba; on 8 July 1966 in Vastseliina) is an Estonian musician and politician. She has been member of XIV Riigikogu.

In 1997 she graduated from Estonian Academy of Music and Theatre in opera singing.

Since 2017 she is a member of Tallinn City Council.

Since 2012 she is a member of Estonian Conservative People's Party. She is the wife of Conservative People's Party of Estonia politician Mart Helme.

References

21st-century Estonian politicians
21st-century Estonian women politicians
1966 births
Conservative People's Party of Estonia politicians
Estonian Academy of Music and Theatre alumni
Estonian musicians
Living people
Members of the Riigikogu, 2019–2023
Members of the Riigikogu, 2023–2027
People from Võru Parish
Women members of the Riigikogu